Isrotel Ltd. is an Israeli hotel chain. Most of its hotels are located in the city of Eilat. As of 2022, Isrotel operates 22 hotels, and related tourism services, including restaurants, spas, a diving center, and shopping centers.

History 
Businessman David Lewis opened the Isrotel King Solomon Hotel in Eilat in 1980. The hotel chain expanded to 12 hotels by 2011 and 19 by 2019 with plans to increase to 22 hotels by 2022 and 30 by 2025.

List of hotels 

Isrotel manages 21 hotels across Israel:

Eilat

Isrotel Royal Beach Eilat
Isrotel King Solomon
Isrotel Sport Club
Isrotel Lagoona
Isrotel Riviera
Isrotel Royal Garden
Isrotel Agamim
Isrotel Yam Suf

Tel Aviv

 Isrotel Royal Beach Tel Aviv
 Isrotel Sea Tower (Formerly Isrotel Tower)
 Isrotel Port Tower

Jerusalem

 Isrotel Cramim Spa & Wine
 Isrotel Orient Jerusalem

Dead Sea

 Isrotel Nevo (Formerly Isrotel Dead Sea)
 Isrotel Ganim

Galilee

 Isrotel Mitzpeh Hayamim
 Isrotel Gomeh

Negev Desert

 Isrotel Beresheet
 Isrotel Ramon Inn
 Isrotel Kedma

Haifa

 Isrotel Carmel Forest Spa Resort

Herzliya

 Isrotel Publica Herzlyia

References

Travel and holiday companies of Israel
Hotel chains
Hotels established in 1981
Israeli brands
Hospitality companies of Israel
1981 establishments in Israel